Stickle Ridge is a ridge rising to about 720 m, west of Saint Martha Cove on James Ross Island. The weathered red lavas of the ridge were examined by British Antarctic Survey (BAS) geologists during the 1985–86 season. Named descriptively by the United Kingdom Antarctic Place-Names Committee (UK-APC) after the spiny nature of the ridge.

Ridges of Graham Land
Landforms of James Ross Island